Don Lee was a country singer, song writer, producer and guitarist who recorded in the 1960s and 1970s. He had a hit on the country charts with "16 Lovin' Ounces to the Pound". He also wrote a couple more songs that became hits. One became a hit for Jerry Naylor.

Background
In addition to his country music background, he was a guitarist who also had a rock background. He recorded material in the 1960s that was released on two albums. Years later his album Keepin' It Country was released. There is speculation that he also had a connection to The Champs of "Tequila fame as well as being a member of Don Rich's group The Buckaroos.

Career

1960s to 1970s
Between 1967 and 1969, Lee had two albums released on the  Custom and Crown labels. They were Dreams Of The Everyday Housewife and True Grit (And Other Pop Country Favorites). He also released an album during the 1960s, I Love You So Much It Hurts And Other Country And Western Favorites under the pseudonym of Terry Lee.

In October, 1974, Lee was appearing at the Country Western Jubilee festival which was held outside Los Angeles at Devonshire Downs between the 11th and 13th.
Two months later in December, a song he co-wrote with Robert L. Duncan, "Is This All There Is To A Honky Tonk" and recorded by Jerry Naylor was released on a single. Backed with "You're The One" it was released on Melodyland 6003. The song spent ten weeks on the Country charts, peaking at #31 on March 29, 1975. In 1976, a song he co-wrote with Lloyd Goodson, "Jesus is the Same in California" was released on United Artists UA-XW891-Y. It became a hit for Goodson. Spending six weeks in the charts, it peaked at #80 on November 12, 1976.

1980s
In 1981, his own single "I'm In Love With A Memory" bw "Cowley County" was released on Crescent 101. It was co-written with George R. White.
By July 1982, his song "16 Lovin' Ounces To The Pound" was released. It was produced by Lee himself and co-written with B. Duncan, B. R. Jones and J. R. Halper. It stayed on the charts for three weeks peaking at #86 on September 18, 1982.

Death
Lee died on December 8, 1995 at age 54.

Compositions

Discography

References

External links
 Music VF.com, Songs written by Don Lee
 Library of Congress. Copyright Office.. Catalog of Copyright Entries 1975 Music Jan-June 3D Ser Vol 29 Pt 5Sec 2 (Volume Catalog of Copyright Entries 3D Ser Vol 29 Pt 5 Sec 2) online Don Lee compositions

1941 births
1995 deaths
American country guitarists
American country singer-songwriters
American male singer-songwriters
Country musicians from Kansas
Crown Records artists
Custom Records artists
20th-century American male singers
20th-century American singers
Singer-songwriters from Kansas